Senator Morris may refer to:

Members of the Australian Senate
John Morris (Australian politician) (1936–2013), Australian Senator for New South Wales from 1985 to 1990
Kenneth Morris (politician) (1903–1978), Australian Senator for Queensland from 1963 to 1968

Members of the Jamaican Senate
Floyd Morris (born 1969), Jamaican Senator from 1998 to 2016

Members of the United States Senate
Gouverneur Morris (1752–1816), U.S. Senator from New York from 1800 to 1803
Robert Morris (financier) (1734–1806), U.S. Senator from Pennsylvania from 1789 to 1795
Thomas Morris (Ohio politician) (1776–1844), U.S. Senator from Ohio from 1833 to 1839

United States state senate members
Bill Morris (Illinois politician) (fl. 1970s–1980s), Illinois State Senate
Calvary Morris (1798–1871), Ohio State Senate
Earle Morris Jr. (1928–2011), South Carolina State Senate
Harvey R. Morris (1807–1886), New York State Senate
Lewis Morris (1726–1798), New York State Senate
Lorenzo Morris (1817–1903), New York State Senate
Luzon B. Morris (1827–1895), Connecticut State Senate
Mathias Morris (1787–1839), Pennsylvania State Senate
Oscar Morris (1876–1939), Wisconsin State Senate
Richard Morris (New York judge) (1730–1810), New York State Senate
Stephen Morris (politician) (born 1946), Kansas State Senate
Thomas Morris (Wisconsin politician) (1861–1928), Wisconsin State Senate